Go, Diego, Go! is an American animated interactive fourth wall children's television program that premiered on Nickelodeon on September 6, 2005 in the United States. Created and executive produced by Chris Gifford and Valerie Walsh Valdes, the series is a spin-off of Dora the Explorer and follows Dora's cousin Diego, an 8-year-old boy whose adventures frequently involve rescuing animals and protecting their environment.

The series which aired for five seasons consisting of 74 episodes premiered in primetime on Nickelodeon on Tuesday, September 6, 2005 at 8:00 p.m. The show aired in reruns on "Nick on CBS" for 11 months and 3 weeks from September 17, 2005 to September 9, 2006.

The series received favorable reviews from critics and garnered particular acclaim for its portrayal of a bilingual Latino lead character, earning a total of four NAACP Image Award nominations for "Outstanding Children's Program" from 2008 to 2012, as well as earning Imagen Award and Young Artist Award nominations for Jake T. Austin for his role as the voice of Diego.

Premise

The program features eight-year-old Diego (voiced by Jake T. Austin, Seasons 1–3, Matt Hunter, singing voice in Seasons 4–5, Brandon Zambrano, speaking voice in Seasons 4–5) who helps animals in danger, mainly in the rainforest. His cousin is Dora (voiced by Kathleen Herles) from Dora the Explorer, as revealed in multiple episodes. Diego was first introduced in a 2003 episode of Dora the Explorer entitled "Meet Diego!" (originally voiced by brothers Andres and Felipe Dieppa in Season 3 and Gabriel Alvarez in Season 4). Dora makes several appearances throughout the series, usually without Boots by her side.

In most episodes, Diego hears an animal's moan for help at his rainforest Animal Rescue Center. With help from his friends, gadgets, and viewers at home, he sets out to save and help the animal. Sometimes Diego and his friends fix windows in neighborhoods. Just like Dora the Explorer, the show teaches preschool-age children the Spanish language. In addition, there are several songs and uses of Spanish vocabulary. However, the show takes a lesser approach to this and focuses more on the teaching of various animals.

Diego's older sister, Alicia (voiced by Constanza Sperakis, Seasons 1–2; Serena Kerrigan, Season 3; Gabriela Aisenberg, Seasons 4–5), is a computer whiz and also bilingual; she directs the animal rescue calls that come into the center. She also assists Diego in helping the animals they love. Alicia is responsible and kindhearted and always kind to her little brother. Though she is described as eleven-years-old, she is often seen performing tasks (most obviously driving a motor vehicle) that could only be done by a person several years older. Diego also has a jaguar companion named Baby Jaguar (voiced by Thomas Sharkey and Dylan Clark Marshall) who assists him in rescuing the animals. Baby Jaguar also appears in Dora the Explorer along with Diego, but inconsistently; on Go, Diego, Go! he takes on a more active role, and is able to speak.

Diego's parents are described as animal scientists; they appear in several episodes, but their names are never given. He also has another older sister, Daisy, voiced by Iliana Friedson-Trujillo, who appears in "The Bobo's Mother's Day!" with Diego stating that she is home from college. Daisy previously appeared in four "Dora the Explorer" episodes: most prominently in "Dora Saves the Game" and "Daisy, La Quinceanera,” as well as silent cameos in "Dora's Pirate Adventure" and "Dora’s First Trip.” This makes Alicia the middle child and Diego the youngest child and the only son to his parents.

Other characters include Click (voiced by Rosie Perez), a camera that locates the animal calling for help; Rescue Pack (voiced by Keeler Sandhaus and Kyle Brenn), a messenger bag Diego wears that can transform into any object; and two troublesome spider monkeys named the Bobo Brothers (voiced by Jose Zelaya and Andres Felipe Aristizabal), who can be stopped by shouting "Freeze, Bobos!" and Diego often encourages viewers to help him stop them by shouting it. While they might be compared to Swiper from Dora the Explorer, they don't cause trouble for Diego on purpose and they apologize after doing so. And on some occasions, just like Swiper, the Bobos would reveal their "good side" and be nice.

There are a few recurring animal friends that are normally rescued by Diego in their first appearance but appear later to return the favor and help Diego out. The most common of these is Linda the Llama (voiced by Laura Abreu), who has appeared prominently in four episodes and made a cameo appearance in "Three Little Condors."

Whenever a carnivorous predator (such as anacondas) is featured on the show, its diet is not mentioned, unlike when herbivores are shown (such as marmosets). Notable exceptions to this are when an octopus helping Diego is explicitly shown and discussed eating live crabs, when a baby river dolphin who had tickled Diego eats the crabs heading toward a waterfall, when Tuga (Leatherback Sea Turtle) eats jellyfish and when Jorge (little Hawk) eats grasshoppers, however, these prey are not anthropomorphised in the same way that other creatures typically are in the series. Whenever a featured animal is threatened with being eaten by a predator, the prey is described as being "afraid" of the predator. Diego's diet is also not mentioned, however, in at least one episode it is suggested that he is not a vegetarian an issue as the majority of animals in the series are portrayed as anthropomorphic.

In addition to Rosie Perez as a regular, several guest voices appeared throughout the program. Olga Merediz voiced Diego's mother in her first appearance, but was replaced by KJ Sanchez afterwards. Kelly Ripa, and her son, Michael Consuelos both guest star as Mommy Maned Wolf and her pup in two episodes: "Diego’s Wolf Pup Rescue" and "Diego the Hero.” In the episode, "Egyptian Camel Adventure,” actor and singer, Adam Alexi-Malle, guest stars as Jamal the Camel. Héctor Elizondo (star of Chicago Hope and Last Man Standing) appears in "Diego Rescues Prince Vicuña" as both Victor Vicuña and King Vicuña.

Episodes

Characters
Diego Márquez: An 8-year-old Latino boy who speaks English and Spanish. He rescues and cares for all animals that are in trouble. 
Alicia Márquez: Diego's 11-year-old sister who helps him in any campaign. She frequently uses her  laptop computer to discover interesting things about these animals.
Sabrina Marquez: (also voiced by Olga Merediz) is Diego’s Mother and his wife of Nico or Tio in Great Animal Rescuer to be a best friends all with expect Baby Jaguar Alice Daizy and Diego
Nico or Tio Marquez: (also voiced by Sebastian Arcelus ) is Diego’s Father he love husband of Sabrina in a Great Animal Rescuer can be a love a great day rescue all with expect of Alice Diego Baby Jaguar and Daizy
Baby Jaguar: A jaguar and friend of Diego. Baby Jaguar met Diego when he came to his aid. He is bold, daring and always ready to help animals in trouble.
Click: A camera that is mischievous and cheeky. She is able to identify animals and their location by hearing their voices. She is always happy to help Diego find animals in trouble.
Rescue Pack: An orange backpack that can transform into any object Diego needs. Diego uses his backpack to overcome obstacles while rescuing animals.
The Bobo Brothers: Two mischievous spider monkeys that always cause trouble. In most episodes, Diego tries to stop them misbehaving. In turn, they always ask for forgiveness for their actions.
Linda: Linda the Llama is fluent in Spanish, noble, hardworking and is always helpful when Diego needs help. She, like the jaguar cubs, met Diego when he came to her aid.
Dora: Diego's cousin who sometimes helps with rescue missions. Dora loves to solve mysteries and to investigate. She is a recurring character in this series.
Boots: A monkey who's Dora's best friend. Boots is always enthusiastic and usually has no clothes, but he wears a pair of red boots. He only appears in two episodes: "Journey to Jaguar Mountain" (cameo in picture) and "Linda the Llama Saves Carnival".
Backpack: Dora's purple backpack. She goes wherever Dora goes, and carries a large amount of objects that Dora and Diego may need.
Map: Dora's map. He lives inside Backpack's side pocket. He helps out by showing Dora and Diego where they need to go.

Voices

Main
 Diego:
Jake T. Austin (seasons 1–3)
Brandon Zambrano (seasons 4–5, speaking voice)
Matt Hunter (seasons 4–5, singing voice)
 Baby Jaguar:
Thomas Sharkey (seasons 1–3)
Dylan Clark Marshall (seasons 4–5)
Alicia:
Constanza Sperakis (seasons 1–2)
Serena Kerrigan (season 3)
Gabriela Aisenberg (seasons 4–5)
Rosie Perez as Click
Rescue Pack:
Keeler Sandhaus (seasons 1–3)
Kyle Brenn (seasons 4–5)
 Bobo Brothers:
Jose Zelaya (seasons 1–3)
Andres Filipe Aristizabal (seasons 4–5)
Laura Abreu as Linda the Llama
Dora:
Kathleen Herles (seasons 1-3)
Caitlin Sanchez (season 5)
Backpack:
Sasha Toro (seasons 1-3)
Alexandria Suarez (season 5)
Marc Weiner as Map
Boots:
Harrison Chad (season 1)
Regan Mizrahi (season 5)
KJ Sanchez as Mrs. Márquez
Sebastian Arcelus as Mr. Márquez

Guest stars
Olga Merediz as Mrs. Márquez ("Diego Saves Baby Humpback Whale")
Kelly Ripa as Mommy Maned Wolf
Adam Alexi-Malle as Jamal the Camel
Héctor Elizondo as Victor Vicuña and King Vicuña

Broadcast

In the United States, Go, Diego, Go aired on CBS, Nickelodeon, and Nick Jr. In Canada, the show aired on Nickelodeon and Treehouse TV. In the UK, the show aired on Nickelodeon, Nick Jr. and Nick Jr. 2. In Australia, the show aired on Nickelodeon, Nick Jr., and Nine Network. In India, the show aired on Nickelodeon, and Nick Jr. The show also aired in the United States on Spanish television network Univision on its Planeta U Saturday morning children's block from its debut on April 5, 2008 to June 21, 2014.

Home media

DVD releases

Nickelodeon, with Paramount for Region 1 released a number of DVDs featuring one episode from a variety of the animated television series they have produced, including "Go, Diego Go!," "Dora the Explorer," "Blue’s Clues," "Bubble Guppies," "The Fresh Beat Band," "Ni Hao, Kai-Lan," "Team Umizoomi," "Wonder Pets!," and "Yo Gabba Gabba," an average of 6 on each DVD.

Go Diego Go! episodes featured as bonus episodes in the DVD releases of Dora the Explorer, produced primarily by Paramount.

In other media

Film
Diego is featured in the live-action Dora film Dora and the Lost City of Gold film played by Jeff Wahlberg.

Live shows
A live show called "The Great Jaguar Rescue" is about Diego saving Baby Jaguar's growl. This is also the premise of an episode of the series that aired on January 15, 2007. A touring live version of the series was staged in 2007, starring Richard J. Portela as the role of Diego.

Video game
Go, Diego, Go!: Great Dinosaur Rescue is an action-adventure video game developed by Take-Two Interactive and Jester Interactive for the Nintendo DS, and published by 2K Play for the Wii and PlayStation 2 in 2008.

References

External links
See also
 
 Go, Diego, Go! at TVGuide.com
Channels
 Go Diego Go on Nick Jr. Australia
 Go Diego Go on Nick Jr. Belgium
 Go Diego Go on Nick Jr. Canada
 Go Diego Go on Nick Jr. Italy
 Go Diego on Nick Jr. Latin America
 Go Diego on Nick Jr. Netherlands 
 Go Diego Go on Nick Jr New Zealand
 Go Diego Go on Nick Jr. South East Asia
 Go Diego Go on Nick Jr. UK 
 Go Diego Go on Nick Jr. US
 Go Diego Go on TF1
 Go Diego Go on Treehouse

2000s American animated television series
2000s American children's television series
2010s American animated television series
2010s American children's television series
2005 American television series debuts
2011 American television series endings
2000s preschool education television series
2010s preschool education television series
2000s Nickelodeon original programming
2010s Nickelodeon original programming
American children's animated action television series
American children's animated adventure television series
American children's animated musical television series
American animated television spin-offs
American preschool education television series
Animated preschool education television series
Nature educational television series
Dora the Explorer
Hispanic and Latino American television
English-language television shows
Spanish-language education television programming
Nick Jr. original programming
Univision original programming
Animated television series about children
Animated television series about siblings
Animated television series about monkeys
Animated television series about animals
Jungles in fiction